The Lena Plateau, also known as Prilensky Plateau (Prilenskoye Plato), is one of the great plateaus of Siberia. Administratively it is mostly within the Sakha Republic (Yakutia), with a small sector in the Irkutsk Oblast, Far Eastern Federal District, Russia. The plateau is named after the Lena River, which flows across it.

Protected areas
There are spectacularly eroded rock formations composed of gypsum-bearing and saline limestone, dolomite and, in some places sandstone, in different spots of the plateau. The Lena Pillars, lining the banks of river Lena in the region, are the most well-known of these features. They were declared a UNESCO World Heritage Site in 2012. Other protected areas in the plateau are the Sinyyaya Pillars by river Sinyaya, and the Turuuk Khaya Rocks by the Lyutenge River. The Olyokma Nature Reserve is located on the eastern side, partly within neighboring Aldan Highlands.

Geography
The Lena Plateau is located in the southern Sakha Republic, between the Lower Tunguska River in the west and the Amga River in the east. The Central Siberian Plateau, is located to the northwest and the Central Yakutian Lowland to the north. To the south, beyond the Aldan, rise the Olyokma-Chara Plateau and the Aldan Highlands. 

The plateau is located in a permafrost zone where the soil freezes down to hundreds of meters. 

The Lena Plateau occupies a very large area, including parts of the districts of Mirny, Suntar, Verkhnevilyuy, Gorny, Khangalassky, Megino-Kangalassky, Lensky, Olyokmin, Amgin and Aldan in the Sakha Republic, as well as parts of Katanga and Bodaybin districts in the Irkutsk Oblast.

Hydrography
The Namana, Buotama, Menda, Suola, Kenkeme, Bappagay, Kempendyay (Кемпендяй), Tatta, Tamma, Peleduy, Nyuya, Pilyuda, Ichera, Chona, Sinyaya, Markha, Lungkha, Tyugyuene, Ulakhan-Botuobuya, Malaya Botuobuya, Matta, Biryuk, Cherendey, Ura, Sitte and Lyutenge are some of the watercourses having their source in the plateau.

Flora and climate
There are taiga forests made up mostly of pine and larch in the higher areas. Wetlands and meadows are common in the river valleys cutting across the plateau.

The plateau is characterized by a harsh continental climate, with long cold winters and sparse amounts of snow. Most of the yearly precipitation falls in the summer in the form of rain.

See also 
 Geography of Russia § Topography and drainage
 Patom Highlands

References

External links
Physiogeography of the Russian Far East
Wetlands in Russia - Vol.4

Central Siberian Plateau
Plateaus of the Sakha Republic
Landforms of Irkutsk Oblast